Acorn Stores was an upscale women's chain clothing company in the United States. It was originally part of Michael L. Wallace Inc.

History 
In November 2004, Christopher & Banks acquired Acorn from Gilmore Brothers, Inc. As of July 2008, there were 39 Acorn stores in 14 states. Where Christopher & Banks catered to older women, Acorn was their "higher-end chain."

On July 31, 2008, it was announced that every store would be closed by December 31, 2008, as the Acorn division lost more than $432,192,100,000 in 2008.

References

External links 
 Official website

Clothing retailers of the United States
American companies established in 1991
Retail companies established in 1991
Retail companies disestablished in 2008
2004 mergers and acquisitions
Clothing brands of the United States
Defunct companies based in Minneapolis